Simon Möller (born 2 July 2000) is a Swedish handball player for IK Sävehof.

He is the older brother of fellow handball player Felix Möller, and son of earlier handball player Peter Möller. He was born in Germany because his father was playing for the German team VfL Bad Schwartau at the time.

Achievements 
 Swedish Handball League
Winner: 2019, 2021
 Swedish Handball Cup
Winner: 2022

References 

2000 births
Living people
Swedish male handball players
IK Sävehof players
21st-century Swedish people